All Killer, No Filler: The Anthology (also called The Jerry Lee Lewis Anthology: All Killer, No Filler!) is a 1993 box set collecting 42 songs by rock and roll and rockabilly pioneer Jerry Lee Lewis from the mid-1950s to the 1980s, including 27 charting hits. The album has been critically well received. In 2003, Rolling Stone listed the album at #245 in its list of "Rolling Stone's 500 Greatest Albums of All Time", maintaining its rating in a 2012 revised list, and dropping to #325 in the 2020 update. Country Music: The Rough Guide indicated that "[t]his is the kind of full-bodied, decades-spanning treatment that Lewis's long, diverse career more than well deserves."

Track listing

Disc one 
 "Crazy Arms" (Ralph Mooney, Chuck Seals) – 2:44
 "End of the Road" (Jerry Lee Lewis) – 1:48
 "It'll Be Me" (Jack Clement) – 2:45
 "All Night Long" (Don Chapel, Traditional) – 2:03
 "Whole Lotta Shakin' Goin On" (Sonny David, Dave Williams) – 2:52
 "You Win Again" (Hank Williams) – 2:55
 "Great Balls of Fire" (Otis Blackwell, Jack Hammer) – 1:51
 "Down the Line" (Roy Orbison, Sam Phillips) – 2:13
 "Breathless" (Blackwell) – 2:42
 "High School Confidential" (Ron Hargrave, Lewis) – 2:29
 "Break Up" (Charlie Rich) – 2:38
 "In the Mood" (Joe Garland, Andy Razaf) – 2:20
 "I'm on Fire" (Bob Feldman, Jerry Goldstein, Richard Gottehrer) – 2:23
 "Money (That's What I Want)" (Janie Bradford, Berry Gordy Jr.) – 4:28
 "Another Place, Another Time" (Jerry Chesnut) – 2:25
 "What's Made Milwaukee Famous (Has Made a Loser Out of Me)" (Glenn Sutton) – 2:35
 "She Still Comes Around (To Love What's Left of Me)" (Sutton) – 2:29
 "To Make Love Sweeter for You" (Jerry Kennedy, Sutton) – 2:49
 "Don't Let Me Cross Over" (Joe Penny) – 2:58
 "One Has My Name (The Other Has My Heart)" (Hal Blair, Eddie Dean, Dearest Dean) – 2:38
 "Invitation to Your Party" (Bill Taylor) – 1:57

Disc two 
 "She Even Woke Me Up to Say Goodbye" (Doug Gilmore, Mickey Newbury) – 2:39
 "One Minute Past Eternity" (Stan Kesler, Taylor) – 2:05
 "I Can't Seem to Say Goodbye" (Don Robertson) – 2:33
 "Once More With Feeling" (Kris Kristofferson, Shel Silverstein) – 2:24
 "There Must Be More to Love Than This" (Thomas LaVerne, Taylor) – 2:43
 "Please Don't Talk About Me When I'm Gone" (Sidney Clare, Sam H. Stept) – 2:24
 "Touching Home" (Dallas Frazier, A.L. Owens) – 2:36
 "Would You Take Another Chance on Me" (Jerry Foster, Bill Rice) – 2:51
 "Chantilly Lace" (J.P. Richardson) – 2:50
 "No Headstone on My Grave" (Rich) – 5:22
 "Drinkin' Wine, Spo-Dee-O-Dee" (Stick McGhee, J. Mayo Williams) – 3:38
 "Sometimes a Memory Ain't Enough" (Stan Kesler) – 2:54
 "Meat Man" (Mack Vickery) – 2:46
 "He Can't Fill My Shoes" (Frank Dycus, Larry Kingston) – 2:32
 "Let's Put It Back Together Again" (Foster, Rice) – 3:18
 "Middle Age Crazy" (Sonny Throckmorton) – 3:54
 "Come on In" (Bobby Braddock) – 2:32
 "I'll Find It Where I Can" (Michael Clark, Zack Vanasdale) – 2:46
 "Over the Rainbow" (Harold Arlen, E.Y. "Yip" Harburg) – 3:45
 "Thirty-Nine and Holding" (Foster, Rice) – 2:56
 "Rockin' My Life Away" (Vickery) – 3:27

Personnel

Performance 

 
 John Allen – guitar
 Tony Ashton – organ
 Joe Babcock – choir, chorus
 Byron Bach – cello
 John Bahler – choir, chorus
 Brenton Banks – violin
 Stuart Basore – steel guitar
 George Binkley III – violin
 Hal Blaine – percussion, drums
 Harold Bradley – guitar
 Jim Brown – organ
 Albert Wynn Butler – trombone
 Kenneth A. Buttrey – drums
 Paul Cannon – guitar
 Jerry Carrigan – drums
 Fred Carter – guitar
 John Catchings – cello
 Marvin Chantry – viola
 Steve Chapman – acoustic guitar
 Roy Christensen – cello
 Virginia Christensen – violin
 John Christopher, Jr. – guitar
 Jack Clement – bass guitar
 Tony Colton – percussion
 Steve Cropper – guitar
 Dorothy Ann Dillard – choir, chorus
 Donald "Duck" Dunn – bass guitar
 Ned Davis – steel guitar
 Louis Dean Nunley – choir, chorus
 Edward DeBruhl – bass guitar
 Pete Drake – steel guitar
 John Duke – flute, saxophone
 Bobby Dyson – bass guitar
 Ray Edenton – guitar
 Dolores Edgin – choir, chorus
 Harvey "Duke" Faglier – guitar, electric guitar
 Stan Farber – choir, chorus
 Matthew Fisher – percussion
 Solie Fott – violin
 Milton Friedstand – strings
 Linda Gail Lewis – vocals, performer
 Pete Gavin – drums
 Joan Gilbert – strings
 Noel Gilbert – strings
 Carl Gorodetzky – violin
 Lloyd Green – steel guitar
 Jim Haas – choir, chorus
 Lennie Haight – violin
 Jack Hale – trombone
 John Hanken – drums
 Buddy Harman – drums
 Herman Hawkins – bass guitar
 Hoyt Hawkins – choir, chorus
 Ron Hicklin – choir, chorus
 Charles "Chas" Hodges – bass guitar
 Ginger Holladay – choir, chorus
 Mary Holladay – choir, chorus
 Priscilla Ann Hubbard – choir, chorus
 Lillian Hunt – violin
 Jim Isbell – drums
 Al Jackson Jr. – drums
 Wayne Jackson – trumpet
 Roland Janes – bass guitar, guitar, acoustic bass
 Otis Jett – drums
 Kenney Jones – drums
 Martin Katahn – violin
 Thomas "Bunky" Keels – organ, electric piano
 Mike Kellie – drums
 Jerry Kennedy – guitar
 Stan Kesler – bass guitar
 Dave Kirby – electric guitar
 Sheldon Kurland – violin
 Albert Lee – guitar
 Alvin Lee – guitar
 Billy Lee Riley – guitar
 Jerry Lee Lewis – percussion, piano, vocals
 Mike Leech – bass guitar
 Wilfred Lehmann – violin
 Leo Lodner – bass guitar
 Ed Logan – tenor saxophone
 Andrew Love – saxophone
 Kenny Lovelace – acoustic guitar, fiddle, guitar
 Rebecca Lynch – violin
 Neal Matthews – choir, chorus
 Tim May – guitar
 Charlie McCoy – harmonica, vibraphone
 Martha McCrory – cello
 Augie Meyers – organ, Vox organ
 James Mitchell – horn
 Dennis Molchan – violin
 Bob Moore – bass guitar
 Scotty Moore – guitar
 Gene Morford – choir, chorus
 Cam Mullins – conductor
 Weldon Myrick – steel guitar
 Anne Oldham – strings
 Charles Owens – steel guitar
 June Page – choir, chorus
 David "Dave" Parlato – bass guitar
 Brian Parrish – percussion
 Ray Phillips – bass
 William Puett – horn
 Hargus "Pig" Robbins – organ, piano, electric piano
 Stephen Sefsik – clarinet
 Dale Sellers – guitar
 Pete Shannon – guitar
 Jerry Shook – guitar
 Lea Jane Singers – choir, chorus
 Pamela Sixfin – violin
 Ray Smith – acoustic guitar
 Gordon Stoker – choir, chorus
 Bill Strom – organ
 Sugar Sweets – choir, chorus
 Jimmy Tarbutton – guitar
 Morris "Tarp" Tarrant – drums
 William Taylor – trumpet
 Donald Teal – violin
 Samuel Terranova – violin
 Bobby Thompson – acoustic guitar
 James "J.M." Van Eaton – drums
 David Vanderkooi – cello
 Gary VanOsdale – viola
 Mack Vickery – harmonica
 Klaus Voormann – bass guitar
 Herman Wade – guitar
 Ray C. Walker – choir, chorus
 Hurshel Wiginton – leader, choir, chorus
 Anna Williams – choir, chorus
 Stephanie Woolf – violin
 Gary Wright – organ
 William Wright – choir, chorus
 Chip Young – guitar
 Joe Zinkan – bass guitar

Production 
 James Austin – compilation producer
 Jack Clement – producer
 Tony Colton – producer
 Geoff Gans – art direction
 Jimmy Guterman – liner notes
 Bones Howe – producer
 Bill Inglot – remastering
 Jerry Kennedy – producer
 Stan Kesler – producer
 Eddie Kilroy – producer
 Sigfried Loch – producer
 Huey P. Meaux – producer
 Monster X – design
 Ken Perry – remastering
 Sam Phillips – producer
 Steve Rowland – producer
 Showtime Music Archives – photography
 Shelby Singleton – producer
 Billy Strange – string arrangement
 D. Bergen White – string arrangement

Contribution unspecified 
 Stephen Clapp
 Roy Dea
 Millie Kirkham
 Norman Ray

References 

Jerry Lee Lewis albums
Rhino Records compilation albums
1993 compilation albums
Country music compilation albums
Rock compilation albums